The Amazing Race 34 is the thirty-fourth season of the American reality television show The Amazing Race. It featured twelve teams of two competing in a race around the world.

The season premiered on CBS on September 21, 2022, following the premiere of Survivor 43, and concluded on December 7, 2022.

Dating couple Derek Xiao and Claire Rehfuss (from Big Brother 23) were the winners of this season, while long-lost twins Emily Bushnell and Molly Sinert finished in second place, and married couple Luis Colon and Michelle Burgos finished in third place.

Production

Development and filming

On March 9, 2022, CBS renewed The Amazing Race for a thirty-fourth season set to air during the 2022–23 television season.

As in the previous season, production began on May 22, 2022, with a chartered Titan Airways Boeing 757, used to reduce personal interactions associated with COVID-19 infections, departing from Los Angeles International Airport. Filming began on May 25, 2022, in Munich, Germany, making it the first time the American version started outside the United States. Jordan was visited for the first time in the entire franchise. Filming concluded in Tennessee in mid-June.

This season originally planned to exclude non-elimination legs for the first time in franchise history. However, after one team received a positive COVID-19 test and was removed from the race, the last team to arrive in the leg received the final departure time as a penalty at the beginning of the next leg. The first leg of the season, announced as the series' 400th leg, featured "a game-changing element" called the Scramble, where teams were told the locations of all of the tasks that they had to complete at the start of the leg and could complete them in any order.

Prior to the premiere, CBS News Sunday Morning aired a segment with correspondent Tracy Smith competing on the first leg with her husband.

The season began showing in the Wednesday 10pm time slot, following Survivor and The Real Love Boat. Starting on November 2, The Amazing Race was moved into the 9pm time slot when The Real Love Boat was shifted onto Paramount+.

Casting
Casting opened in mid-November 2021. Contestants were required to be fully vaccinated.

Marketing
Expedia replaced Travelocity as one of the series' sponsors.

Cast

The cast included Big Brother 23 HouseGuests Derek Xiao and Claire Rehfuss, former Los Angeles Rams cheerleader Quinton Peron, and former New York Jets and Buffalo Bills head coach Rex Ryan. Rex Ryan was originally asked to compete with his twin brother, Rob Ryan, but the latter was unable to compete due to his work obligations with the Las Vegas Raiders. Aubrey Ares and David Hernandez were not initially selected for the final cast, but were called to compete two hours before The Amazing Race started production.

Results
The following teams are listed with their placements in each leg. Placements are listed in finishing order. 
A  placement with a dagger indicates that the team was eliminated.
An italicized placement indicates a team's placement at the midpoint of a Mega Leg.

Notes

Race summary

Leg 1 (Germany)

Episode 1: "Many Firsts But Don't Be Last" (September 21, 2022)
Prize: US$2,500 each (awarded to Derek & Claire)
Eliminated: Aastha & Nina
Locations
Munich, Germany (Nymphenburg Palace) (Starting Line & Scramble)
Munich (Luitpoldpark)
Munich (Englischer Garten – Seehaus Biergarten)
Munich (Augustiner-Keller Biergarten) 
Munich (Friedensengel ) 
Episode summary
Teams began the race at the Nymphenburg Palace in Munich, Germany. In the series' first Scramble, teams had to complete each of the following tasks in any order so as to get three parts of the clue which, when assembled, directed teams to the pit stop.
For the task at the Luitpoldpark, entitled Roll, teams had to roll a beer keg through an obstacle course within 55 seconds in order to receive a puzzle piece. If teams were unsuccessful, they had to wait out a two-minute penalty before making another attempt.
For the task at the Seehaus Biergarten, entitled Saw, teams had to use a two-man saw to saw completely through a log to the beat of Bavarian music in order to receive a puzzle piece.
 For the season's first Roadblock at the Augustiner-Keller Biergarten, entitled Smash, one team member had to use provided tools to free a puzzle piece from an ice block.
The three puzzle pieces fit together to form the shape of the Friedensengel and the written instructions directed teams to the pit stop there.
Additional note
This leg was announced as The Amazing Races 400th leg.

Leg 2 (Germany → Austria)

Episode 2: "Patience, Is the New Me" (September 28, 2022)
Prize: Reward points for a five-night trip for two to Lima, Peru and Machu Picchu (awarded to Marcus & Michael)
Eliminated: Tim & Rex
Locations
Munich (Friedensengel ) 
Patsch, Austria (Grünwalderhof) 
Innsbruck (Marktplatz)
Innsbruck (Stiftskeller  Annasäule) 
Innsbruck (Hofburg Imperial Palace) 
Episode summary
At the beginning of this leg, teams departed from the Friedensengel in groups 15 minutes apart based on the order of their arrival at the previous pit stop, and had to drive to Grünwalderhof in Patsch, Austria, in order to find their next clue.
 In this leg's Roadblock, one team member had to correctly sing three Alpine yodels in order to receive their next clue. Before beginning this task, both team members had to don traditional Austrian costumes, which they had to wear for the rest of the leg.
After completing the Roadblock, teams traveled to the Marktplatz in Innsbruck in order to find their next clue.
 This season's first Detour was a choice between Bells Ringin' or Partners Swingin'. In Bells Ringin', teams had to use Tyrolean bells to play a traditional Austrian folk song called "Tiroler Glockenklang" in order to receive their next clue. In Partners Swingin', teams had to learn and correctly perform a traditional Austrian wedding dance in order to receive their next clue.
Teams had to check in at the pit stop: the Hofburg Imperial Palace in Innsbruck.

Leg 3 (Austria → Italy)

Episode 3: "It's All in the Details" (October 5, 2022) &Episode 4: "Everyone's an Artist" (October 12, 2022)
Prize: Reward points for a five-night trip for two to Sydney, Australia, the Blue Mountains, and Hunter Valley (awarded to Emily & Molly)
Eliminated: Rich & Dom
Locations
 Innsbruck → Bologna, Italy
Bologna (Sanctuary of the Madonna di San Luca) 
Bologna (Arco del Meloncello)
Bologna (University of Bologna – Teatro Anatomico  Formaggeria Barbieri) 
Bologna (Ducati Factory) 
Florence (Villa Bardini) 
Florence (Piazza della Repubblica, Piazza del Duomo & Piazza della Signoria  Osteria Belle Donne, Il Latini & Vivoli Gelato) 
Florence (Piazza Ognissanti) 
Episode summary (Episode 3)
During the pit stop, teams were flown to Bologna, Italy, and began the next leg at the Sanctuary of the Madonna di San Luca. Teams departed in groups 15 minutes apart based on the order of their arrival at the previous pit stop and had to drive to the Arco del Meloncello in order to find their next clue.
 This leg's first Detour was a choice between Head of the Class or The Big Cheese. In Head of the Class, teams had to listen to an anatomy lecture from a sixteenth century instructor and then take an exam where they had to identify bones, muscles, and organs within 90 seconds in order to receive their next clue. In The Big Cheese, teams had to use a cart to transport an  wheel of parmesan to the Ristorante Diana, where a professional cheese cutter sliced the cheese in half. Teams then had to deliver half to each of two different restaurants, collect a receipt at each restaurant, and then return them to the fromagerie in order to receive their next clue.
After completing the first Detour, teams had to drive to the Ducati Factory, where they found their next clue.
 In this leg's first Roadblock, one team member had to attach wheels, brakes, and body panels to a Ducati Panigale V4 in order to receive their next clue.
Episode summary (Episode 4)
After completing the first Roadblock, teams had to drive to Florence and find their next clue at the Villa Bardini.
 In this leg's second Roadblock, one team member had to use provided tools to remove plaster surrounding a sculpture in order to receive their next clue.
 This leg's second Detour was a choice between Eye for Fashion or Window of Opportunity. In Eye for Fashion, teams had to find three fashion shoots taking place around the city, study the outfits, and then match outfit sketches with the locations of the shoots in order to receive their next clue. In Window of Opportunity, teams had to find three wine windows, pick up Tuscan soup, cured meats, and biscotti, and then deliver them to an outdoor trattoria in order to receive their next clue.
Teams had to check in at the pit stop: the Piazza Ognissanti in Florence.

Leg 4 (Italy → Jordan)

Episode 5: "The Amazing Race of Arabia" (October 19, 2022)
Prize: US$5,000 each (awarded to Luis & Michelle)
Eliminated: Linton & Sharik
Locations
 Florence → Aqaba, Jordan
 Aqaba Governorate (Wadi Rum Desert)  
Petra (Al-Khazneh)
Petra (Palace Tomb) 
Petra (Great Temple) 
Episode summary
During the pit stop, teams were flown to Aqaba, Jordan. Once there, teams boarded an Ottoman Empire-era steam train that took them into the desert, where they watched a scene reminiscent of Lawrence of Arabia before receiving their next clue. Teams then departed in groups 15 minutes apart based on the order of their arrival at the previous pit stop, and were driven to their next clue in the Wadi Rum Desert.
 In this leg's Roadblock, one team member had to use a metal detector to search a movie set for a piece of "spaceship debris" that identified the location of their next clue: Petra.
After completing the Roadblock, teams were driven to Petra and had to find their next clue outside Al-Khazneh.
 This leg's Detour was a choice between Camel Caravan or Palace Puzzle. In Camel Caravan, teams had to carry four bags of hay and water from a cistern to camels at a market in order to receive their next clue. In Palace Puzzle, teams had to complete a slide puzzle of the Palace Tomb in order to receive their next clue.
Teams had to check in at the pit stop: the Great Temple in Petra.

Leg 5 (Jordan)

Episode 6: "Step By Step" (October 26, 2022)
Prize: Reward points for a five-night trip for two to Barcelona, Spain (awarded to Luis & Michelle)
Eliminated: Abby & Will
Locations
Amman (Amman Citadel) 
Amman (Maktabat Khizanat al-Jahith Bookstore)
Amman (Roman Theater  Odeon Theater) 
Amman (Al-Hashemi Street Park) 
Amman (Nymphaeum) 
Episode summary
At the beginning of this leg, Phil Keoghan announced that Abby & Will had received a positive COVID-19 test and were therefore eliminated from The Amazing Race. Phil also announced that there would be no additional elimination at the end of this leg. Teams then departed simultaneously from the Amman Citadel and made their way to the Maktabat Khizanat al-Jahith Bookstore, where they found their next clue.
 This leg's Detour was a choice between Step By Step or Letter By Letter. In Step By Step, teams had to learn and perform a Jordanian dance at the Roman Theater in order to receive their next clue. In Letter By Letter, teams had to learn and recite the 28 letters of the Arabic alphabet at the Odeon Theater in order to receive their next clue.
 In this leg's Roadblock, one team member had to assemble a cart called an earaba in order to receive their next clue.
After completing the Roadblock, teams had to bring their earaba to the pit stop at the Nymphaeum in Amman.

Leg 6 (Jordan → France)

Episode 7: "It's Simply Medieval" (November 2, 2022)
Prize: US$7,500 each (awarded to Marcus & Michael)
Eliminated: Glenda & Lumumba
Locations
 Amman → Toulouse, France
Beynac-et-Cazenac (Château de Beynac) 
Les Eyzies (Château de Commarque) 
Domme (La Ferme de Turnac) 
Domme (Panorama) 
Episode summary
During the pit stop, teams were flown to Toulouse, France, and began the next leg at the Château de Beynac. Teams departed in groups 15 minutes apart based on the order of their arrival at the previous pit stop, and had to drive to the Château de Commarque in order to find their next clue.
 In this leg's Roadblock, one team member had to study the Commarque family tree, rappel  down an exterior wall of the Château de Commarque, and then match five names to their family crests in order to receive their next clue.
After completing the Roadblock, teams had to drive to La Ferme de Turnac in Domme, where they found their next clue.
 This leg's Detour was a choice between Walnut Cracker or Medieval Gamer. In Walnut Cracker, teams had to crack and press walnuts until they produced enough walnut oil to fill a container, after which they could receive their next clue. In Medieval Gamer, teams had to complete three medieval games in order to receive their next clue.
Teams had to check in at the pit stop: the Panorama in Domme.

Leg 7 (France)

Episode 8: "La Ville Rose" (November 9, 2022)
Prize: Reward points for a five-night trip for two to Bangkok, Thailand (awarded to Derek & Claire)
Eliminated: Quinton & Mattie
Locations
Domme (Panorama) 
Toulouse (Stade Toulousain) 
Toulouse (Couvent des Jacobins)
Toulouse (Place Saint-Sernin  Promenade du Docteur Charles Rose) 
Toulouse (Canal de Brienne – Pays d'Oc) 
Episode summary
At the beginning of this leg, teams departed from the Panorama in Domme in groups 15 minutes apart based on the order of their arrival at the previous pit stop, and had to drive to Stade Toulousain in Toulouse, where they found their next clue.
 In this leg's Roadblock, one team member had to perform a rugby training drill and then complete a drop kick in order to receive their next clue.
After completing the Roadblock, teams had to drive to the Couvent des Jacobins and find a musician playing a French horn, who had their next clue.
 This leg's Detour was a choice between Say Six or Lay Bricks. In Say Six, teams had to find three poets, who each displayed and recited two verses of the poem, "Demain dès l'aube" by Victor Hugo. Teams then had to recite the six verses to a judge in order to receive their next clue. In Lay Bricks, teams had to arrange bricks so as to recreate a sidewalk pattern in order to receive their next clue.
Teams had to check in at the pit stop: the Pays d'Oc on the Canal de Brienne.

Leg 8 (France → Spain)

Episode 9: "Vamos a la Playa" (November 16, 2022) &Episode 10: "Don't Look Down" (November 23, 2022)
Prize: Reward points for a five-night trip for two to Tokyo, Japan (awarded to Luis & Michelle)
Eliminated: Marcus & Michael
Locations
 Toulouse → Málaga, Spain
Málaga (Castillo de Gibralfaro) 
Málaga (Plaza de la Merced) 
 Málaga (Málaga Cathedral → Port of Málaga – El Cubo)
 Málaga (Playa El Palo ) 
Ronda (Puente Nuevo)
Ronda (Arab Baths   El Casino & Hispania Flamenco) 
Ronda (Paseo de Kazunori Yamauchi)
Ronda (Puente Nuevo) 
Ronda (Mirador de Ronda) 
Episode summary (Episode 9)
During the pit stop, teams were flown to Málaga, Spain, and began the next leg at the Castillo de Gibralfaro. Teams departed in groups 15 minutes apart based on the order of their arrival at the previous pit stop, and made their way to Plaza de la Merced, where they found their next clue.
 In this leg's first Roadblock, one team member had to arrange six glass panels so as to recreate Pablo Picasso's Three Musicians and receive their next clue.
After completing the first Roadblock, teams had to travel by bicycle from the Málaga Cathedral to El Cubo, where they found their next clue.
 This leg's first Detour was a choice between Fish Fry or Sailboat Supply. For both tasks, teams had to travel by bicycle to Playa El Palo. In Fish Fry, teams had to skewer and roast 18 sardines in order to create a local dish called espetos and receive their next clue. In Sailboat Supply, teams had to inflate a standup paddleboard and then deliver life vests and a cooler filled with ice to a yacht anchored offshore in order to receive their next clue.
After completing the first Detour, teams received a postcard depicting a particular view of their next location, which they had to figure out was the Puente Nuevo in Ronda. 
Episode summary (Episode 10)
After arriving in Ronda, teams had to find a tour guide holding the flag of Andalusia, who had their next clue.
 This season's final Detour was a choice between Bend over Backwards or Dress for Success. In Bend over Backwards, teams had to assemble a Moorish brick arch in order to receive their next clue. In Dress for Success, teams had to accessorize a flamenco dancer so that she matched an onstage performer in order to receive their next clue.
After completing the second Detour, teams had to find a woodcarver with their next clue on the Paseo de Kazunori Yamauchi.
The final clue of the leg instructed teams to find the pit stop "in between Ernest and Orson", and teams had to figure out that they needed to find Mirador de Ronda and the monuments to both Ernest Hemingway and Orson Welles.

Leg 9 (Spain → Iceland)

Episode 11: "How Am I Going to Survive This?" (November 30, 2022)
Prize: Reward points for a five-night trip for two to London, England and Stonehenge (awarded to Derek & Claire)
Eliminated: Aubrey & David
Locations
 Málaga → Reykjavík, Iceland
 Skógar (Skógafoss) → Mýrdalshreppur (Sólheimajökull) 
Fljótshlíð (Fljótshlíðarfoss) 
Thingvellir National Park (Silfra Fissure)
Hrunamannahreppur (Gullfoss) 
Episode summary
During the pit stop, teams were flown to Reykjavík, Iceland. Teams then traveled by helicopter to the Sólheimajökull Glacier and began the leg in groups 15 minutes apart based on the order of their arrival at the previous pit stop. There, both team members had to climb the glacier and retrieve the flag of Iceland in order to receive their next clue. Teams then had to drive the Fljótshlíðarfoss, where they found their next clue.
 In this leg's Roadblock, one team member had to rappel  into a cave, retrieve their next clue, and then navigate down a river through a canyoneering course in order to reunite with their partner.
After completing the Roadblock, teams had to drive to the Silfra Fissure, where they had to don snorkeling gear, memorize fourteen Icelandic volcanoes and their years of eruption while swimming in the fissure, and then match the names of the volcanoes with the correct year of eruption. When they were correct, a volcanologist revealed the location of the pit stop: the Gullfoss in Hrunamannahreppur.
Additional notes
Icelandic-American actor Ólafur Darri Ólafsson appeared as the pit stop greeter in this leg.
Aubrey & David chose to quit the task at the Silfra Fissure and received a two-hour penalty.

Leg 10 (Iceland → United States)

Episode 12: "The Only Leg That Matters" (December 7, 2022)
Winners: Derek & Claire
Second Place: Emily & Molly
Third Place: Luis & Michelle
Locations
 Reykjavík → Nashville, Tennessee
Lynchburg (Jack Daniel's Distillery) 
Nashville (Korean War Veterans Memorial Bridge) 
Nashville (Gibson Garage)
Nashville (Tootsie's Orchid Lounge, Whiskey Bent Saloon & Wildhorse Saloon)
Nashville (Nashville Municipal Auditorium)
Nashville (Ryman Auditorium) 
Episode summary
During the pit stop, teams were flown to Nashville, Tennessee, and began the final leg simultaneously at the Jack Daniel's Distillery. There, one team member had to properly label and tag thirty bottles of Jack Daniel's Tennessee whiskey before placing them on a conveyor belt. If the bottles were approved, the other team member had to pack them into boxes in order to receive their next clue, which instructed teams to drive to the Korean War Veterans Memorial Bridge, where they found their next clue.
At Gibson Garage, teams received their next clue from season 22 and season 24 contestants Caroline Cutbirth and Jennifer Wayne, which instructed them to deliver one Gibson guitar to each of three different honky-tonks on Broadway in order to receive tickets to the Nashville Municipal Auditorium.
At the Nashville Municipal Auditorium, teams had to press keys on a floor piano, which revealed images, until they found the eleven notes that displayed images they'd seen during previous legs of the race, and then play them in chronological order within 11 seconds. If teams played the notes in the correct order, they received their final clue directing them to the finish line: the "Mother Church of Country Music", which they had to figure out was the Ryman Auditorium.
{| class="wikitable unsortable" style="text-align:center;"
! scope="col" | Leg
! scope="col" | Image
! scope="col" | Piano note
|-
! scope="row" | 1
|Smash supplies
|B4
|-
! scope="row" | 2
|Flag of Austria
|G♯3/A♭3
|-
! scope="row" rowspan="2" | 3
|Ducati Panigale V4
|C♯2/D♭2
|-
|Chisel Roadblock
|C♯5/D♭5
|-
! scope="row" | 4
|The Treasury
|D3
|-
! scope="row" | 5
|Amman Citadel
|F♯4/G♭4
|-
! scope="row" | 6
|Commarque crests
|A2
|-
! scope="row" | 7
|French horn player
|E5
|-
! scope="row" rowspan="2" | 8
|El Cubo
|F♯2/G♭2
|-
|Ronda postcard
|F3
|-
! scope="row" | 9
|Land Rover
|G4
|}

Ratings

U.S. Nielsen ratings

References

External links

 34
2022 American television seasons
Television series impacted by the COVID-19 pandemic
Television shows filmed in Germany
Television shows filmed in Austria
Television shows filmed in Italy
Television shows filmed in Jordan
Television shows filmed in France
Television shows filmed in Spain
Television shows filmed in Iceland
Television shows filmed in Tennessee